Monmouth Baseball Field is a baseball venue in West Long Branch, New Jersey, United States.  It is home to the Monmouth Hawks baseball team of the NCAA Division I Metro Atlantic Athletic Conference.  The facility is located at the southwest corner of the Monmouth campus.  It features a natural grass surface and has the following dimensions: 325 ft. (LF), 365 ft. (LCF), 390 ft. (CF), 365 ft. (RCF), 320 ft. (RF).

See also 
 List of NCAA Division I baseball venues

References 

College baseball venues in the United States
Baseball venues in New Jersey
Monmouth Hawks baseball
West Long Branch, New Jersey